Hoffmeister is a hamlet in the town of Morehouse, Hamilton County, New York, United States. Hoffmeister has a post office with ZIP code 13353, which opened on September 19, 1900.

References

Hamlets in Hamilton County, New York
Hamlets in New York (state)